Marvila is a freguesia (civil parish) and district of Lisbon, the capital of Portugal. Located in eastern Lisbon, Marvila is to the southwest of Parque das Nações north of Beato, and east of Alvalade. The population in 2011 was 37,793.

History
It was created on February 7, 1959.

References

Parishes of Lisbon